Hellacious Acres is the second album by heavy metal band Dangerous Toys, released in 1991. It was produced by Roy Thomas Baker, and includes a cover of Bad Company's "Feel Like Makin' Love", while "Line 'Em Up" and "Gimme' No Lip" were released as singles to promote the album. This is Dangerous Toys' last album to be released on Columbia Records, and the only album that guitarist Danny Aaron played on, as he left the band during the 1991-1992 Hellacious Acres tour.

Track listing

Personnel
Dangerous Toys
 Jason McMaster - vocals
 Scott Dalhover - guitar
 Mike Watson - bass, backing vocals
 Danny Aaron - guitar, slide guitar, backing vocals
 Mark Geary - drums

Additional musicians
 Waste 'O' Skin Choir - gang vocals on "Stick & Stones"
 Brian Baker, Chris Gates, Michael Hannon, David Roach, George Dolivo, Greg Fields, Andy Rogers, Vickie James Wright, Chris Andrada, Mitch Dean

Production
 Roy Thomas Baker - producer
 Timm Baldwin - engineer
 Rick Ornstien, Ken Pavlakovich, Jim Champagne, Scott Blockland - assistant engineer
 George Marino - mastering at Sterling Sound, NYC

Charts

References

1991 albums
Albums produced by Roy Thomas Baker
Dangerous Toys albums
Columbia Records albums